Sarit is a unisex given name. Notable people with the name include:

Female
Sarit Hadad (born 1978), Israeli musician
Sarit Kraus (born 1960), Israeli academic and computer scientist
Sarit Shenar (born 1983), Israeli football player

Male
Sarit Kumar Das, Indian academic
Sarit Thanarat (1908–1963), Thai military officer and politician 

Hebrew feminine given names
Thai masculine given names
Indian masculine given names
Unisex given names